The Erskine Flying Fleet football team represents Erskine College in the sport of American football. The Flying Fleet compete in the NCAA Division II as an independent, but will join the South Atlantic Conference as an associate member in 2022. Erskine is a dual member of the National Christian College Athletic Association (NCCAA). The team is currently led by head coach Shap Boyd, who has held the position since November 15, 2018, making him the first head football coach at Erskine since 1951.

The Erskine College football program was terminated after the 1951 season. The team went on hiatus before announcing the return for the 2020. The program will practice in 2019, and its players will use a redshirt season. Due to the global coronavirus pandemic, the fall 2020 season was postponed until spring 2021. The program played its first game in 70 years on 27 February 2021, defeating Barton College 30-28.

History
Erskine football started in 1896. It was discontinued in 1951. The period from 1917 to 1921 brought most of the program's success, including athlete Dode Phillips. During those seasons they have wins against Wofford, Presbyterian, South Carolina, Clemson, and the Citadel. It was during a game in 1929 that Erskine took on the name "The Flying Fleet". They were given that name by a Greenville reporter who was blown away by their passing performance in the game. They had previously been known as the "Seceders". On October 18, 1948 when they defeated Florida State 14–6. It was only a couple more years until the Flying Fleet ended their football program in 1951.

In 2018, Erskine College announced return of the football program for the 2020 season competing in NCAA Division II.

Conference affiliations

In 1915, Erskine began intercollegiate football and competed for the state title with other members of the South Carolina Intercollegiate Athletic Association. In 1925, Erskine joined the ranks of the Southern Intercollegiate Athletic Association. In 1939, Erskine was a founding member of the South Atlantic Conference, which was for "small liberal arts schools that do not place undue emphasis upon athletics." The conference's founding members were Erskine, Newberry, Oglethorpe, Presbyterian, and Wofford. They added Rollins and Stetson in 1940, and then Mercer in 1941 before it disbanded due to several programs discontinuing football. The schools maintained membership in the S.I.A.A. while also competing for the South Atlantic title. Erskine was also a member of the South Carolina Little Four alongside Newberry, Presbyterian, and Wofford. The "Little Four" informally was naming champions in the period before the war as well.

Seasons 

• = Interim head coach, 
† = Conference champions, 
‡ = Conference co-champions,
♯ = Little Four champions,
♮ = Little Four co-champions

References

External links
 

 
1896 establishments in South Carolina
1951 disestablishments in South Carolina
American football teams established in 1896
American football teams disestablished in 1951